The 1999 West Coast Conference Baseball Championship Series was held on May 21 and 22, 1999 at alternating campus sites, and pitted the winners of the conference's two four-team divisions.

Seeding

Results
Game One

Game Two

Game Three

References

West Coast Conference Baseball Championship
Tournament
Baseball in Los Angeles
Sports competitions in Los Angeles County, California
West Coast Conference Baseball Championship Series
West Coast Conference Baseball Championship Series